The Solid Trumpet of Cootie Williams is an album by trumpeter Cootie Williams that was recorded in 1962 and released on the Moodsville label (a Prestige subsidiary).

Track listing
 "Concerto for Cootie" (Duke Ellington) – 2:37
 "Sugar Blues" (Clarence Williams, Lucy Fletcher) – 2:51
 "You're Nobody till Somebody Loves You" (Russ Morgan, Larry Stock, James Cavanaugh) – 4:15
 "Some of These Days" (Shelton Brooks) – 3:46
 "Night Train" (Jimmy Forrest, Oscar Washington) – 5:24
 "Around the World in Eighty Days" (Victor Young, Harold Adamson) – 4:03
 "Liza" (George Gershwin, Ira Gershwin, Gus Kahn) – 3:10
 "Birmingham Blues" (Hampton Reese) – 5:26

Personnel
Cootie Williams – trumpet
Nat Jones – piano
Harold Dodson – bass
Bill Peeples – drums

References

Cootie Williams albums
1962 albums
Moodsville Records albums